Following is a list of all Article III United States federal judges appointed by President Jimmy Carter during his presidency. In total Carter appointed 262 Article III federal judges, including 56 judges to the courts of appeals, 203 judges to the United States district courts, 2 judges to the United States Court of Claims and 1 judge to the United States Court of Customs and Patent Appeals. Later presidents have exceeded Carter's total number of judicial appointments, which had itself surpassed the previous record of 235 set by Richard Nixon, but Carter retains the record for the largest number of judicial appointments in a single term.

Although Carter made no appointments to the Supreme Court of the United States, two of his Court of Appeals appointees—Stephen Breyer and Ruth Bader Ginsburg—were later appointed to the Supreme Court by Bill Clinton.

None of Carter's appointees remain in active status, however 9 appellate judges and 25 district judges remain on senior status. Four additional judges appointed by Carter to district courts remain on senior status as appellate judges by appointment of later presidents, as is one appellate judge appointed to the Supreme Court.

Courts of Appeals

District Courts

Specialty courts (Article III)

United States Court of Claims

United States Court of Customs and Patent Appeals

Notes

Renominations

References
General

 

Specific

Sources
 Federal Judicial Center

Carter
 
Presidency of Jimmy Carter
Jimmy Carter-related lists